Tanjung Harapan is a notable tourist attraction in Selangor. It is located near the Northport in Port Klang.

Trivia
Tanjung Harapan is also the Malay name for the Cape of Good Hope, South Africa.

Klang District
Populated places in Selangor